The Silent Fall is a 2007 South African drama film set in and around Cape Town, focusing on the AIDS problem of Africa. The film was directed by Roger Hawkins.

Plot 
The story is set in motion after the brutal murder of a South African doctor who is on the brink of discovering a break through generic AIDS drug. If found to be successful, the cost-effective drug could cripple pharmaceutical giant, the Kingdom Corporation. The story explodes into a web of intrigue and danger as Kingdom's role in the doctor's death is brought into question. This, and a continent in the grips of a heartless pandemic, provide the dramatic backdrop against which heroine Dr. Thandie Khumalo's personal journey unfolds. She struggles to come to terms with her beloved colleague's murder and the loss of her friends and family to the pandemic which she has dedicated her life to fighting. Vying for her heart and mind as she searches for the truth are Lucas De Villiers, the charming yet ruthless CEO of Kingdom, and handsome fellow doctor Josh Kingsley.

Cast 
Miles Anderson as Joseph Kingsley
Leon Clingman as Edward Graham
Aaliyah Madyun as Thandie Khumalo
Matthew Rutherford as Lucas Devilliers
Justin Smith as Josh Kingsley

External links
 Official site: Sunrise Corporation
 News - The Silent Fall
 
 TV Interview - That's a wrap
Eternal Pictures website, distributor of The Silent Fall

2007 films
2007 drama films
2000s English-language films
English-language South African films
South African drama films